Keenan MacDougall (born March 18, 1990) is a Canadian football defensive back who is currently a free agent. He was selected 15th overall by the Stampeders in the 2012 CFL Draft. After the 2011 CIS season, he was ranked as the 14th best player in the Canadian Football League’s Amateur Scouting Bureau final rankings for players eligible in the 2012 CFL Draft, and eighth by players in Canadian Interuniversity Sport. He played CIS football with the Saskatchewan Huskies.

MacDougall played in his first regular-season CFL game on July 1, 2012 against the Montreal Alouettes. In the first quarter of that game, he picked up a Montreal fumble and ran it back 63 yards for a touchdown.

References

External links
Calgary Stampeders bio 

1990 births
Living people
Players of Canadian football from Saskatchewan
Canadian football defensive backs
Saskatchewan Huskies football players
Sportspeople from Saskatoon
Calgary Stampeders players
Saskatchewan Roughriders players